In the physical sciences, the Airy function (or Airy function of the first kind)  is a special function named after the British astronomer George Biddell Airy (1801–1892). The function  and the related function , are linearly independent solutions to the differential equation

known as the Airy equation or the Stokes equation. This is the simplest second-order semilinear differential equation with a turning point (a point where the character of the solutions changes from oscillatory to exponential).

Definitions

For real values of x, the Airy function of the first kind can be defined by the improper Riemann integral:

which converges by Dirichlet's test. For any real number  there is positive real number  such that function  is increasing, unbounded and convex with continuous and unbounded derivative on interval . The convergence of the integral on this interval can be proven by Dirichlet's test after substitution .

 satisfies the Airy equation

This equation has two linearly independent solutions.
The standard choice for the other solution is the Airy function of the second kind, denoted Bi(x).

Properties

Here,  denotes the Gamma function.

When  is positive,  is positive, convex, and decreasing exponentially to zero, while  is positive, convex, and increasing exponentially. When  is negative,  and  oscillate around zero with ever-increasing frequency and ever-decreasing amplitude. This is supported by the asymptotic formulae below for the Airy functions.

The Airy functions are orthogonal in the sense that

again using an improper Riemann integral.

Neither  nor its derivative  have positive real zeros. The "first" real zeros (i.e. nearest to x=0) are:
 "first" zeros of its derivative  are at x ≈ −1.01879, −3.24820, −4.82010, −6.16331, ...

Asymptotic formulae

As explained below, the Airy functions can be extended to the complex plane, giving entire functions. The asymptotic behaviour of the Airy functions as |z| goes to infinity at a constant value of  depends on : this is called the Stokes phenomenon. For  we have the following asymptotic formula for :

Asymptotic expansions for these limits are also available. These are listed in (Abramowitz and Stegun, 1983) and (Olver, 1974).

Similarly to before, when :

When  we have:

Complex arguments
We can extend the definition of the Airy function to the complex plane by

where the integral is over a path C starting at the point at infinity with argument  and ending at the point at infinity with argument π/3.

The asymptotic formula for Ai(x) is still valid in the complex plane if the principal value of x2/3 is taken and x is bounded away from the negative real axis. The formula for Bi(x) is valid provided x is in the sector  for some positive δ.

It follows from the asymptotic behaviour of the Airy functions that both Ai(x) and Bi(x) have an infinity of zeros on the negative real axis. The function Ai(x) has no other zeros in the complex plane, while the function Bi(x) also has infinitely many zeros in the sector .

Plots

Relation to other special functions
For positive arguments, the Airy functions are related to the modified Bessel functions:

The first derivative of the Airy function is

Functions K1/3 and K2/3 can be represented in terms of rapidly convergent integrals (see also modified Bessel functions )

For negative arguments, the Airy function are related to the Bessel functions:

Here, J±1/3 are solutions of

The Scorer's functions Hi(x) and -Gi(x) solve the equation y′′ − xy = 1/π. They can also be expressed in terms of the Airy functions:

Fourier transform
Using the definition of the Airy function Ai(x), it is straightforward to show its Fourier transform is given by

Applications

Quantum mechanics 
The Airy function is the solution to the time-independent Schrödinger equation for a particle confined within a triangular potential well and for a particle in a one-dimensional constant force field. For the same reason, it also serves to provide uniform semiclassical approximations near a turning point in the WKB approximation, when the potential may be locally approximated by a linear function of position. The triangular potential well solution is directly relevant for the understanding of electrons trapped in semiconductor heterojunctions.

Optics 

A transversally asymmetric optical beam, where the electric field profile is given by the Airy function, has the interesting property that of its maximum intensity accelerates towards one side instead of propagating over straight line as is the case in symmetric beams. This is at expense of the low-intensity tail being spread in the opposite direction, so the overall momentum of the beam is of course conserved.

Caustics 

The Airy function underlies the form of the intensity near an optical directional caustic, such as that of the rainbow. Historically, this was the mathematical problem that led Airy to develop this special function.

Probability 

In the mid-1980s, the Airy function was found to be intimately connected to Chernoff's distribution.

The Airy function also appears in the definition of Tracy–Widom distribution which describes the law of largest eigenvalues in Random matrix. Due to the intimate connection of random matrix theory with the Kardar–Parisi–Zhang equation, there are central processes constructed in KPZ such as the Airy process.

History
The Airy function is named after the British astronomer and physicist George Biddell Airy (1801–1892), who encountered it in his early study of optics in physics (Airy 1838). The notation Ai(x) was introduced by Harold Jeffreys. Airy had become the British Astronomer Royal in 1835, and he held that post until his retirement in 1881.

See also

The proof of Witten's conjecture used a matrix-valued generalization of the Airy function.
Airy zeta function

Notes

References

 
 Frank William John Olver (1974). Asymptotics and Special Functions, Chapter 11. Academic Press, New York.

External links
 
 
 Wolfram function pages for Ai and Bi functions. Includes formulas, function evaluator, and plotting calculator.
 

Special functions
Special hypergeometric functions
Ordinary differential equations